The 1992–93 AHL season was the 57th season of the American Hockey League. Sixteen teams played 80 games each in the schedule. The Binghamton Rangers finished first overall in the regular season with 124 points, a record which holds to this day. The Cape Breton Oilers won their first Calder Cup championship.

Team changes
 The New Haven Nighthawks become the New Haven Senators.
 The Maine Mariners move to Providence, Rhode Island, becoming the Providence Bruins.
 The Hamilton Canucks join the AHL as an expansion team, based in Hamilton, Ontario, playing in the South Division.

Final standings
Note: GP = Games played; W = Wins; L = Losses; T = Ties; GF = Goals for; GA = Goals against; Pts = Points;

Scoring leaders

Note: GP = Games played; G = Goals; A = Assists; Pts = Points; PIM = Penalty minutes

 complete list

Calder Cup playoffs

For the Semifinal round, the team that earned the most points during the regular season out of the three remaining teams receives a bye directly to the Calder Cup Final.

Bill McDougall of the Cape Breton Oilers, recorded 26 goals, and 26 assists for 52 points in 16 games,  setting a record for an average of 3.25 points per playoff game in professional hockey.

Trophy and award winners

Team awards

Individual awards

Other awards

See also
List of AHL seasons

References
AHL official site
AHL Hall of Fame
HockeyDB

 
American Hockey League seasons
2
2